JuiceNet may refer to:
eMotorWerks' Internet of Things (IoT) platform for the smart management of EV charging
H2O: Just Add Water